Arthur Ganson (born 1955) is a kinetic sculptor. He makes mechanical art demonstrations and Rube Goldberg machines with existential themes. His moving sculptures have been exhibited at a number of science museums and art galleries. Ganson's work appeals to viewers of all ages, and has been featured in an animated children's television show. He has invented mass-produced children's toys, and hosts an annual competition to make Rube Goldberg chain reaction machines.

Ganson was an artist-in-residence at the Mechanical Engineering department of the Massachusetts Institute of Technology from 1995–1999. In addition, he has given invited presentations about his work at the TED conference, and at the Long Now Foundation.

Biography 

Ganson was born in Hartford, Connecticut in 1955. He has an older sister, Ellen Ford and a younger brother, Richard Ganson. He received a Bachelor of Fine Arts degree from the University of New Hampshire in 1978. In 1987 he married Rocky Tomascoff and they had one son, Cory. In 2013, Ganson married photographer Chehalis Hegner. They currently live in the Chicago area.

Work 
Ganson describes his work as a cross between mechanical engineering and choreography. His sculptures have been called "gestural, humorous, evocative, and introspective", or "Ingenious. Philosophical. Witty".

Some of his extremely elaborate machines have one very simple function, such as elegantly anointing themselves with lubricating oil scooped up from a pan (Machine with Oil), or causing a chair to chaotically bounce around a toy cat (Margot's Other Cat). Other machines do nothing at all but move in a visually fascinating manner, such as a toy chair that suddenly assembles from small sticks and planks of wood (Cory's Yellow Chair).

Though some critics read deeply philosophical meaning into these works, Ganson's machines also exhibit a childlike, playful side.  One of his constructions is a set of wire gears tethered to a chicken's wishbone, equipped with miniature spikes and made to "walk" back and forth along a miniature roadway (Machine with Chicken Wishbone). This curious apparatus appeared in "Muffy's Art Attack", an episode of the animated children's series Arthur, where it was compared to "the tragicomic works of Samuel Beckett – a tiny figure forever yoked to its burden of absurdity".

Ganson and his wife, Chehalis Hegner, create collaborative works such as "He and She," a kinetic sculpture that interacts with a photograph where a mechanical arm with a feather at the end of it tenderly caresses the toes of the female figure seated on a table.

In addition to his artistic productions, Ganson is also the inventor of Toobers & Zots, a commercial toy-set consisting of bendable foam pieces in abstract shapes that can be assembled into almost anything. He has also been involved in other toy designs.

Friday After Thanksgiving
Since 1999, Ganson has been the emcee ("ringleader") of the annual "Friday After Thanksgiving" (FAT) competition sponsored by the MIT Museum in Cambridge, Massachusetts.  Teams of contestants construct elaborate Rube Goldberg style chain-reaction machines on tables arranged around a large gymnasium.  Each apparatus is linked by a string to its predecessor and successor machine.  The initial string is ceremonially pulled, and the ensuing events are videotaped in closeup, and simultaneously projected on large screens for viewing by the live audience.  After the entire cascade of events has finished, prizes are then awarded in various categories and age levels.  Videos from several previous years' contests are viewable on the MIT Museum website.

In a variation, the competition has used a single golf ball which is passed from one complex mechanism to the next.  The entire event was inspired in 1997, when Ganson saw the film The Way Things Go, by Swiss artists Fischli & Weiss, which portrayed an elaborate chain reaction setup, constructed using ordinary household items and materials.  The next year, Ganson staged such an event and filmed it for the MIT Museum, and in 1999 he opened up the event to team competition.

Exhibitions

Ganson has held residencies in science museums and collaborated with the Studebaker Movement Theatre. His work has been featured in one-man shows at the MIT Museum, Harvard’s Carpenter Center for the Visual Arts, the DeCordova Museum, the Ricco/Maresca Gallery (New York City), and the Exploratorium (San Francisco). He has participated in group shows at Ars Electronica Museum of the Future (Linz, Austria), the Addison Gallery of American Art, and the Bruce Museum.

Ganson has a permanent installation at the National Inventors Hall of Fame in Akron, Ohio.  One of his kinetic sculptures is featured at the entrance to the Lemelson Center for the Study of Invention and Innovation located in the Smithsonian Institution's National Museum of American History, on the National Mall in Washington DC.

Since 1995, a large collection of his works has been on permanent display in Gestural Engineering: The Sculptures of Arthur Ganson at the MIT Museum.

See also
 Alexander Calder
 Rube Goldberg
 Paul Klee
 Jean Tinguely

References

External links

 Arthur Ganson's official website
 Video of several Arthur Ganson sculptures
 Ganson's MIT Museum Exhibition
 Arthur Ganson: Machines and the Breath of Time, a presentation for the Long Now Foundation, September 14, 2009
 
 "Moving sculpture" (TED2002)
 Large collection of Arthur Ganson's videos on YouTube
 Friday After Thanksgiving chain reactions led by Arthur Ganson for the MIT Museum.
 Smithsonian/Lemelson profile of Arthur Ganson's life and his work

University of New Hampshire alumni
MIT School of Engineering faculty
20th-century American sculptors
Articles containing video clips
1955 births
Living people
21st-century American sculptors
People from Hartford, Connecticut